Anne B. McCoy is a theoretical chemist. She is the Natt-Lingafelter Professor of Chemistry at the University of Washington, and her research interests include vibrational spectroscopy, hydrogen bonding, and charge-transfer bands.

Education
McCoy received her BS in Chemistry from Haverford College in 1987. She worked with Edwin L. Sibert at University of Wisconsin–Madison and received her PhD in 1992. McCoy was a Golda Meir postdoctoral fellow with R. Benny Gerber at Hebrew University of Jerusalem and University of California, Irvine.

Research
McCoy joined the Department of Chemistry at Ohio State University as Assistant Professor in 1994, received tenure and was promoted to Associate Professor in 2000, and was promoted to Professor in 2004. Her research focuses on developing methods to study fundamental phenomena such as hydrogen bonds and quantum delocalization and applying theoretical vibrational spectroscopy to understand dynamics.

McCoy moved to the University of Washington in 2015 and is currently the Natt-Lingafelter Professor of Chemistry.

Awards and honors
National Science Foundation CAREER Award, 1998–2003
Camille Dreyfus Teacher/Scholar Award, 1999
Fellow of the American Physical Society, 2007
Fellow of the American Chemical Society, 2009
 Crano Lectureship from the Akron Section of the American Chemical Society, 2011
Fellow of the American Association for the Advancement of Science, 2012
Distinguished Scholar Award, Ohio State University, 2013
Harlan Hatcher Arts and Sciences Distinguished Faculty Award, Ohio State University, 2013

Professional services
Senior Editor, Journal of Physical Chemistry, 2005–2011
Deputy Editor, Journal of Physical Chemistry A, 2011– 
Member, American Chemical Society Committee on Professional Training, 2008–2018 (Chair, 2012–2014)

References

Year of birth missing (living people)
Living people
University of Washington faculty
Haverford College alumni
Ohio State University faculty
University of Wisconsin–Madison alumni
Theoretical chemists
Fellows of the American Physical Society
Fellows of the American Chemical Society
Fellows of the American Association for the Advancement of Science